Poco Ranakah is a volcano located in the south-central part of the island of Flores, Indonesia. Its tallest lava dome, Poco Mandasawu is the tallest mountain of the island. A new lava dome, named Anak Ranakah (the child of Ranakah) was formed there in 1987. The volcano erupted again in 1991. In 2011, diffuse white plumes were seen rising from Anak Ranakah Dome, although no ash was detected.

See also 
 List of volcanoes in Indonesia

References 
 

Ranakah
Ranakah
Ranakah
Pleistocene lava domes